Jayapura is a kug-grama in Koppa taluk of Chikkamagaluru district of Karnataka, India. This town lies in the Western ghats.

Cities and towns in Chikkamagaluru district